The Children is a 1990 British–German drama film directed by Tony Palmer and starring Ben Kingsley, Kim Novak and Britt Ekland. It is based on the 1928 novel by Edith Wharton.

Cast

 Ben Kingsley as Martin Boyne
 Kim Novak as Rose Sellars
 Britt Ekland as Lady Zinnia Wrench
 Donald Sinden as Lord Wrench
 Geraldine Chaplin as Joyce Wheater
 Joe Don Baker as Cliffe Wheater
 Siri Neal as Judith
 Karen Black as Sybil Lullmer
 Robert Stephens as Azariah Dobree
 Rupert Graves as Gerald Ormerod
 Terence Rigby as Duke of Mendip
 Marie Helvin as Princess Buondelmonte
 Rosemary Leach as Miss Scope
 Mark Asquith as Terry
 Ian Hawkes as Bun
 Anouk Fontaine as Blanca
 Eileen Hawkes as Beechy
 Hermione Eyre as Zinnie
 Edward Michie as Chip

See also
The Marriage Playground (1929)

References

Further reading
 Tibbetts, John C., and James M. Welsh, eds. The Encyclopedia of Novels Into Film (2nd ed. 2005) pp 52–53.

External links

1990 films
West German films
English-language German films
1990 drama films
Films directed by Tony Palmer
Films based on American novels
Films based on works by Edith Wharton
British drama films
British remakes of American films
1990s English-language films
1990s British films
1990s German films